Men Call It Love is a 1931 American pre-Code romantic melodrama film directed by Edgar Selwyn and written by Doris Anderson. The film stars Adolphe Menjou, Leila Hyams, Norman Foster, Mary Duncan and Hedda Hopper. The film was released on March 14, 1931, by Metro-Goldwyn-Mayer.

Cast 
Adolphe Menjou as Tony
Leila Hyams as Connie
Norman Foster as Jack
Mary Duncan as Helen
Hedda Hopper as Callie
Robert Emmett Keane as Joe
Harry Northrup as Brandt

References

External links 
 

1931 films
1930s English-language films
American romantic drama films
1931 romantic drama films
Metro-Goldwyn-Mayer films
Films directed by Edgar Selwyn
American black-and-white films
Melodrama films
1930s American films